Twist of Fate may refer to:

Film and television
Twist of Fate (1954 film), British-American mystery
Twist of Fate, 1998 Canadian-American thriller, a/k/a Psychopath, with Mädchen Amick
Twist of Fate (1989 TV series), British drama TV miseries
Twist of Fate (2011 TV series), American documentary
Twist of Fate (2016 TV series), Indian English-language soap opera
Twist of Fate, international name of 2014 Indian television series Kumkum Bhagya

Music
"Twist of Fate" (Olivia Newton-John song), 1984
"Twist of Fate" (Emilia Rydberg song), 1998
"Twist of Fate" (Siobhán Donaghy song), 2003
A Twist of Fate, 2003 EP by John Arch

Other
Twist of Fate, professional wrestling move variation of cutter

See also
A Simple Twist of Fate, 1994 American comedy-drama vehicle for Steve Martin
Twist of Faith (disambiguation)